Río Segundo may refer to:
 Segundo River, a river in Córdoba Province, Argentina.
 Río Segundo, Córdoba, a city in Córdoba Province, Argentina.
 Río Segundo Department, an administrative division of Córdoba Province, Argentina.
 Río Segundo District, an administrative division of Alajuela (canton), Alajuela Province, Costa Rica.